In algebraic geometry, an ind-scheme is a set-valued functor that can be written (represented) as a direct limit (i.e., inductive limit) of closed embedding of schemes.

Examples 
 is an ind-scheme.
Perhaps the most famous example of an ind-scheme is an infinite grassmannian (which is a quotient of the loop group of an algebraic group G.)

See also 
formal scheme

References 
A. Beilinson, Vladimir Drinfel'd, Quantization of Hitchin’s integrable system and Hecke eigensheaves on Hitchin system, preliminary version 
V.Drinfeld, Infinite-dimensional vector bundles in algebraic geometry, notes of the talk at the `Unity of Mathematics' conference. Expanded version
http://ncatlab.org/nlab/show/ind-scheme

Algebraic geometry